The 2010–11 Russian Professional Basketball League (PBL) was the first season of the Russian Professional League, and the 20th overall of the Russian Professional Championship. CSKA Moscow won the title, by beating Kimki Moscow Region 3–1 in the league's playoff Finals.

Format 
In the regular season, all ten teams played against each other three times so in the regular season, each team played 27 games.

Teams

Regular season

Playoffs

Championship bracket
The quarterfinals were played in a best-of-three format, the semi- and finals were played in a best-of-five format.

Classification bracket
All losing teams from the quarter-finals in the championship bracket played in the classification bracket. All rounds were played in a best-of-three format.

Awards

Regular Season MVP
 Maciej Lampe (UNICS Kazan)

Playoffs MVP
 Victor Khryapa (CSKA Moscow)

All-Symbolic Team
First Symbolic Team
 Patrick Beverley (Spartak St. Petersburg)
 Keith Langford (Khimki Moscow Region)
 Henry Domercant (Spartak St. Petersburg)
 Sergei Monia (Khimki Moscow Region)
 Maciej Lampe (UNICS Kazan)
Second Symbolic Team
 Marcus Williams (Yenisey Krasnoyarsk)
 Terrell Lyday (UNICS Kazan)
 Ramūnas Šiškauskas (CSKA Moscow)
 Jeremiah Massey (Lokomotiv Kuban)
 Lonny Baxter (Yenisey Krasnoyarsk)

See also
2010–11 VTB United League

References

External links 
 Professional Basketball League

Russian Professional Basketball League
2010–11 in Russian basketball
Russia